Robert-Magny-Laneuville-à-Rémy is a former commune in the Haute-Marne department in north-eastern France. It was formed in 1972 by the merger of Robert-Magny and Laneuville-à-Rémy, and was dissolved back into those two communes in 2012. Its population was 310 in 2009.

See also
Communes of the Haute-Marne department

References

Robertmagnylaneuvillearemy